Enrique Iglesias is the debut studio album recorded by Spanish singer-songwriter Enrique Iglesias, it was released by Fonovisa on 21 November 1995 (see 1995 in music). The album was a success and topped the Latin charts. It also won the Grammy Award for Best Latin Pop Album at the 39th Annual Grammy Awards on 26 February 1997. The album received a Gold certification in Portugal after a weeks of sales, and has sold more than 4 million copies worldwide. In the United States it was certified Platinum on 18 November 1996, becoming one of the best selling latin albums of all times in that country. All singles of the album hit the number-one spot in the Billboard Hot Latin Tracks chart: "Si Tú Te Vas", "Por Amarte", "No Llores Por Mí" and "Trapecista", the most for any Latin album, beating Selena and Jon Secada with four chart-toppers, each.

Commercial performance
The album debuted in the Billboard Top Latin Albums chart at number 38 in the week of 23 December 1995, climbing to the Top Ten five weeks later. The album dethroned Selena's Dreaming of You in the week of 25 May 1996 (after being in the chart for 28 weeks), spending ten consecutive weeks at pole position and an extra week after being kept off from the top spot by the compilation album Macarena Mix. The album spent 73 weeks inside the Top Ten (with at least two weeks in every position) and 100 weeks in the chart.

Track listing

Credits and personnel

Gordon Lyon: Engineer and mixer
Victor McCoy: Assistant engineer
Paul McKenna: Engineer
Frank Rinella: Assistant engineer
Eric Ratz: Engineer
Barry Rudolph: Engineer
Miguel De La Vega: Engineer
Brad Haehnel: Assistant engineer
Tony Franco: Coordinator
Christina Abaroa: Coordinator
Stephan Ach: Photography
Alan Silfen: Photography
Fernando Martinez: Photography
Rafael Pérez Botija: Producer, arranger, keyboards, Hammond organ
Enrique Iglesias: vocals
Scott Alexander: Bass
Gregg Bissonette: drums
Robbie Buchanan: Hammond organ
Luis Conte: percussion
George Doering: Guitar
Christian Kolm: Guitar
Michael Landau: Guitar
Roberto Morales: Guitar, Advisor
Manuel Santisteban: Arranger, Keyboards
Randy Waldman: Piano
Francis Benítez: vocals, choir
Leyla Hoyle: Vocals, choir
Carlos Murguía: Vocals, choir
Kenny O'Brian: Arranger, Vocals
Stephanie Spruill: Vocals

Charts

Certifications and sales

See also
1995 in Latin music
List of best-selling Latin albums
List of number-one Billboard Top Latin Albums from the 1990s
List of number-one Billboard Latin Pop Albums from the 1990s

References

1995 debut albums
Enrique Iglesias albums
Fonovisa Records albums
Grammy Award for Best Latin Pop Album
Spanish-language albums